A memorial placard of Pope John Paul II, sometimes called Papal Mass Plaque, is installed in Boston Common in Boston, Massachusetts, United States.

Description and history
The memorial commemorates the first Mass he celebrated in the United States, on October 1, 1979, at Boston Common. The Gray granite tablet measures approximately 53.5 x 32 x 8.25 in., and was dedicated on June 28, 1981.

An inscription reads: "POPE JOHN PAUL II / IN COMMEMORATION OF / THE FIRST MASS OFFERED IN THE / UNITED STATES BY HIS HOLINESS ON HIS / FIRST PASTORAL VISIT TO THIS COUNTRY / 1 OCTOBER 1979 / HERE ON BOSTON COMMON / DURING THE 350TH YEAR / OF THE FOUNDING OF BOSTON / "MAY GOD'S PEACE DESCENT ON THIS CITY / OF BOSTON, AND BRING JOY TO EVERY / CONSCIENCE AND JOY TO EVERY HEART." / POPE JOHN PAUL II / GIFT OF THE INTERNATIONAL ORDER OF THE ALHAMBRA".

The work was surveyed by the Smithsonian Institution's "Save Outdoor Sculpture!" program in 1996.

See also
 List of monuments of Pope John Paul II

References

External links
 

1981 establishments in Massachusetts
1981 sculptures
Boston Common
Cultural depictions of Pope John Paul II
Monuments and memorials in Boston
Outdoor sculptures in Boston
Sculptures of men in Massachusetts